Sergio Armando Matto Suárez (13 October 1930 – 23 November 1990) was a basketball player from Uruguay, who twice won the bronze medal with the men's national team at the Summer Olympics: in 1952 and 1956. He competed in three consecutive Olympics for his native country, starting in 1952 (Helsinki, Finland).

References

External links

1930 births
1990 deaths
Basketball players at the 1952 Summer Olympics
Basketball players at the 1956 Summer Olympics
Basketball players at the 1960 Summer Olympics
Olympic basketball players of Uruguay
Olympic bronze medalists for Uruguay
Uruguayan men's basketball players
1959 FIBA World Championship players
Uruguayan people of Spanish descent
People from Canelones Department
Olympic medalists in basketball
Medalists at the 1956 Summer Olympics
Medalists at the 1952 Summer Olympics
Uruguayan emigrants to Brazil